Figurentheater Wilde & Vogel is a German freelance, touring puppet theatre company established in Stuttgart in 1997. In 2009 the company moved to Leipzig.

In 2003 Wilde & Vogel also co-founded the Lindenfels Westflügel Leipzig, where they organize events and work as artistic directors.

Company
Charlotte Wilde studied Music, English and History in Karlsruhe. She improvises, composes and plays music live for the productions of Wilde & Vogel and other theatres on violin, guitar and keys. She is also responsible for the management and production.

Michael Vogel studied puppetry in Prague at Milos Kirschner's Spejbl & Hurvínek theatre and then at the Hochschule für Musik und Darstellende Kunst Stuttgart, where he also taught from 1998 to 2006. In 1999 Michael held a scholarship from the Kunststiftung Baden-Württemberg.

Tours
Since the start in 1997, Figurentheater Wilde & Vogel has been touring in more than 30 different countries in Europe, Africa, America and Asia, amongst others for the Goethe Institute. They have also performed at a number of festivals, including the International Puppet Theatre Festival in Erlangen, German; FIDENA in Bochum, Germany; World Festival 2000 in Magdeburg, Germany; unidram Festival Potsdam; Biennale Internationale de la Marionnette in Paris, France; and Festival of Wonder in Silkeborg, Denmark.

Cooperations
The company has collaborated with a number of other performing arts companies, including the Akademia Teatralna from Białystok and Warsaw in Poland; Kompania Doomsday in Białystok, Poland; FIDENA in Bochum, Germany; Puppentheater der Stadt Halle in Halle; SCHAUBUDE in Berlin, Germany; and Theater des Lachens in Berlin. In Stuttgart they have an ongoing cooperation with FITZ! Zentrum für Figurentheater, and in Leipzig with Lindenfels Westflügel.

Workshops
Figurentheater Wilde & Vogel have also engaged in workshops at the Akademia Teatralna Białystok / Warsaw; Stockholms Stadsteatern in Stockholm, Sweden; Trinity College / Hartford Connecticut; Turku Polytechnic & Arts Academy in Turku, Finland; Muhlenberg College in Allentown, Pennsylvania; Figurentheater-Kolleg Bochum and at the Biennale Internationale de la Marionnette in Paris.

Awards
The company has received 20 awards for its productions, amongst others at the International Solo Puppeteer's Festival in Lódz, Poland in 1998; at the International Puppet Festival of Adult Puppet Theatre in 2001 in Pécs, Hungary; at the XX. International Festival Bielsko-Biala, Poland in 2002 and 2008; at the 5. International Festival "Spectaculo Interesse" in 2003 in Ostrava, Czech Republic; the Theaterpreis der Stuttgarter Zeitung in 2007; the George Tabori Award 2013 Fonds Darstellende Künste; and the award at the International Theatre Festival in 2013 in Puebla, México Hector Azar.

Productions

Wilde & Vogel
 Galerie Fred Songs Joachim Will, dir. by Anja Göpfert, 1991
 Oh wie schön ist Panama Songs Joachim Will, dir. by Ensemble, 1994
 [Exit. Eine Hamletfantasie dir. by Frank Soehnle, 1997
 Nils Holgersson with Claudia Olma, dir. by Christiane Zanger, 1998
 Toccata. Ein Nachtstück über Robert Schumann dir. by Frank Soehnle, 2000
 Orpheus Underground with Johannes Frisch, Miriam Goldschmidt, Wolfgang Kroke, Fine Kwiatkowski, Claudia Olma, Jason Träder, Bénédicte Trouvé, dir. by Hendrik Mannes, 2001
 Maria auf dem Seil with Ines Müller-Braunschweig, dir. by Christiane Zanger, 2002
 King Lear – Work in Progress with Johannes Frisch, Miriam Goldschmidt, co-direction Claudia Olma, Michael Meschke, Hendrik Mannes, 2003–2006
 The Hobbit – or there and back again with Florian Feisel, dir. by Christiane Zanger, 2004
 Midsummer Night's Dream – reorganized with Christoph Bochdansky (A), dir. by Astrid Griesbach, 2004
until doomsday with Kompania Doomsday (PL), Akademia Teatralna Warszawa / Department of Puppetry Art Bialystok, dir. by Michael Vogel, 2004
 Salomé with Kompania Doomsday (PL), dir. by Michael Vogel, 2005
 Spleen. Charles Baudelaire: Poems in Prose dir. by Hendrik Mannes, 2006
 Lear with Johannes Frisch, Frank Schneider, dir. by Hendrik Mannes, 2007
 Mewa with Kompania Doomsday (PL), dir. by Hendrik Mannes, 2008
 FAUST spielen with Christoph Bochdansky (A), dir. by Christiane Zanger, 2008
 Krabat with Pawel Chomczyk, Florian Feisel, Dagmara Sowa, dir. by Christiane Zanger, 2010
 Songs for Alice with Johannes Frisch, dir. by Hendrik Mannes, 2011
 Głośniej! / Louder! with Teatr Hotel Malabar, Warszawa, directed by Michael Vogel, performed by: Marcin Bartnikowski and Marcin Bikowski, 2012
 Makariens Archiv with AKHE Theatre/театр АХE/St. Petersburg, directed by Pawel Semtschenko, performed by: Stefan Wenzel and Alisa Olejnik, scenography: Michael Vogel, 2013
Panpopticon / Паноптикон mit Gulliver Puppet Theatre Kurgan / Театр кукол "Гулливер" (R), 2014
REM mit Białostocki Teatr Lalek, Lehmann+Wenzel, Grupa Coincidentia, 2014
SIBIRIEN directed by Christiane Zanger, 2015
Session: Short Cuts. Kleist – Unwahrscheinliche Wahrhaftigkeiten mit Miriam Goldschmidt, Directed by Mannes, Dramaturgie: Antonia Christel 2015
Die Empfindsamkeit der Giganten Christoph Bochdansky, Directed by Gyula Molnár, 2016
Session: Songs from the Graveyard Frank Schneider, Johannes Frisch, Konrad Schreiter, Fiona Ebner, 2016
Session: Short Cuts. "Die Familie Schroffenstein" H. v. Kleist mit Anne Tismer, Directed by Mannes, Dramaturgie: Christel 2016
Session: Short Cuts. "Penthesilea" H. v. Kleist mit Marina Tenório Directed by Mannes, Dramaturgie: Christel, 2017
Frankenstein oder der Moderne Prometheus Directed by Hendrik Mannes, Dramaturgie: Antonia Christel, Mit Winnie Luzie Burz, Jan Jedenak, Stefan Wenzel, Johannes Frisch]], Ilka Schönbein, 2017
Session: Kukułka 1 & 2 Westflügel Leipzig and Solniki44, Lehmann+Wenzel, Grupa Coincidentia, Directed by Stefanie Oberhoff, 2017
N₂0₂Ar Gewandhaus Chor, Gregor Meyer, Lehmann+Wenzel, Directed by Franziska Merkel, 2017
Versuche auf der Luft zu sitzen, with Lehmann+Wenzel, Gewandhauschor Leipzig, Gregor Meyer, Directed by Franziska Merkel, 2018
STAUB – DUST – אבק with Golden Delicious [ISR/CH], Ari Teperberg, Inbal Yomtovian Dramaturgy: Jonas Klinkenberg - directed by Antonia Christl, Hendrik Mannes, 2018
KUKUŁKA - A Fictional Documentary Grupa Coincidentia [Białystok/ PL], Lehmann+Wenzel  Directed by: Łukasz Kos, Dramaturgy: Fiona Ebner, 2019
DER REIGEN / THE MERRY-GO-ROUND  Choreography: Rose Breuss, Christoph Bochdansky, Kai Chun Chuang, Damian Cortes Alberti, Marcela Lopez Morales, Music: Protect Laika
The Flowers of Evil, Directed by Hendrik Mannes, Dramaturgy, Co-direction Antonia Christl, 2021
MICRO, Artistic Advice Joachim Fleischer, Musical Advice Johannes Frisch, 2021
I am not in a Room, with Kai Chun Chuang, Choreographia[Inter]Austriaca, Choreography Rose Breuss, 2022

Productions at other theatres (puppetry, music or direction) 

 Lug und Trug – Drei Groschen und kein bißchen Oper, Hochschule für Musik und Darstellende Kunst Stuttgart, dir. by Frank Soehnle, 1995
 Die große Wut des Philipp Hotz, Theater Waidspeicher Erfurt, Hochschule für Musik und Darstellende Kunst Stuttgart, dir. by Andreas Günther, 1996
 Turandot, Staatsoper Stuttgart, dir. by Nicolas Brieger, 1997
Bossa Nova Theater Paradox Stuttgart, Regie: Frank Soehnle, 1997
Der Sturm bat-Studiotheater Berlin, Ausstattung Michael Vogel, Regie Markus Joss, 2000
 Das Fest des Lamms Badisches Staatstheater Karlsruhe, dir. by Donald Berkenhoff, 2002
 Die Schöne und das Biest Puppentheater der Stadt Halle], dir. by Ralf Meyer, 2002
Der kleine Prinz Landesbühne Esslingen, dir. by Hubert Habig, 2002
 Leonard Theater der Jungen Welt Leipzig, dir. by Ines Müller-Braunschweig, 2003
 Konen i Muddergroeften Nørregaards Teater Ebeltoft (DK), dir. by Michael Vogel, 2004
 until doomsday – The Ballad of the Flying Dutchman Akademia Teatralna Warsaw/ Bialystok (PL), dir. by Michael Vogel, 2004
King Kong Marotte Figurentheater Karlsruhe, dir. by Friederike Krahl, 2006
 Bruckner – Genie der Töne by Jürgen Czwienk, ZDF/ 3sat, first broadcast at Schleswig-Holstein-Musikfestival, 2007
Die vier Lichter des Hirten Simon dir. by Angelika Jedelhauser, Zikade Theater, FITZ Stuttgart 2009
 Der Freischütz Lehmann+Wenzel, directed by Michael Vogel (Leipziger Bewegungskunstpreis 2013), 2013
Little Shop Of Horrors – Białystok Puppet Theatre, 2018

External links
 www.figurentheater-wildevogel official website
 www.westfluegel.de Partner at Leipzig

Puppet theaters
Puppet troupes
Puppetry in Germany